Youngblood Bridge is a historic bridge in Union Church, Jefferson County, Mississippi. It is located on Youngblood Road in Union Church, Mississippi, over the Fifteenmile Creek

Overview
It was built by J.F. Gallbreath and Schuster & Jacob. and has been listed on the National Register of Historic Places since May 23, 1979.

References

Road bridges on the National Register of Historic Places in Mississippi
National Register of Historic Places in Jefferson County, Mississippi
Bridges completed in 1900